Gloucester was an electoral district of the Legislative Assembly in the Australian state of New South Wales, originally created in 1880, partly replacing Williams, and named after Gloucester (which it included) or Gloucester County (which it overlapped). In 1920, with the introduction of proportional representation, it was absorbed into Oxley, along with Raleigh. It was recreated in 1927, and abolished in 1988 and replaced by Myall Lakes and Port Stephens.

Members for Gloucester

Election results

References

Former electoral districts of New South Wales
1880 establishments in Australia
Constituencies established in 1880
1920 disestablishments in Australia
Constituencies disestablished in 1920
1927 establishments in Australia
Constituencies established in 1927
1988 disestablishments in Australia
Constituencies disestablished in 1988